Backshall is a surname. Notable people with the surname include:

 Steve Backshall (born 1973), English naturalist, explorer, presenter and writer
 Tim Backshall (television presenter), English television presenter

See also
 Boxall, surname